William O'Connell may refer to:

 William Henry O'Connell (1859–1944), American cardinal of the Roman Catholic Church
 William O'Connell (priest), Archdeacon of Tuam, 1928–1939
 William O'Connell (politician) (1852–1903), member of the Queensland Legislative Assembly
 William O'Connell (actor) (born 1933), American film and television actor